Anson Parsons Hotaling or Houghtaling (Feb 28, 1827, New York  – Feb 16, 1900, San Francisco ) was a San Francisco merchant and real estate developer.

Hotaling was the third son and sixth child of Garrit A Ho(u)ghtaling (1789 -1876) and Hanna Parsons (1789-1880), his surname ultimately deriving from the Dutch surname Hoogteijling. Born and raised in rural New York, he sailed for San Francisco in 1852 on "The Racehound".  The route at that time was around Cape Horn, and his ship put into several South American cities for provisioning.  He was tempted to stay in South America, but continued on to San Francisco.  Once in California, he briefly tried his hand at mining but within a year returned to San Francisco and opened a wine and spirit business, owned in partnership.  By 1866 his business had much expanded and he was sole owner and operator.  He began a shipping venture, trading with both the South Sea islands, and the settlements on the Pacific coast of Russia.  Later he expanded his trade to Australia.  He bought a considerable amount of real estate throughout the states of California, Oregon, and Washington, and also invested in iron and mercury mining.

He married Lavinia J. Linen on Nov. 3, 1863.  Two of Hotaling's four sons predeceased him. Richard M. Hotaling served on the San Francisco Board of Supervisors from 1900.

Hotaling Place, a one-block lane in the Jackson Square Historic District that has been called "San Francisco's oldest alley", is named after him. Hotaling maintained a warehouse there for his whiskey business, which may have helped saving the building in the 1906 earthquake and fire, as commemorated in a poem by Charles K. Field that today is displayed on a plaque there:

If, as they say, God spanked the town 
For being over-frisky,
Why did He burn His churches down
And spare Hotaling's Whiskey?

References 

1827 births
1900 deaths
History of San Francisco
American drink distillers
American real estate businesspeople
American businesspeople in shipping
Iron mining
19th-century American businesspeople